Finsen may refer to:

People 
 Lawrence Finsen, American ethicist
 Niels Ryberg Finsen (1860–1904), Faroese-Icelandic physician and scientist
 Susan Finsen, American ethicist
 William Stephen Finsen (1905–1979), South African astronomer

Other uses 
 Finsen (crater), on the moon
 Finsen Laboratory, in Copenhagen
 1794 Finsen, a minor planet